Augustan literature refers to the pieces of Latin literature that were written during the reign of Caesar Augustus (27 BC–AD 14), the first Roman emperor. In literary histories of the first part of the 20th century and earlier, Augustan literature was regarded along with that of the Late Republic as constituting the Golden Age of Latin literature, a period of stylistic classicism.

Most of the literature periodized as "Augustan" was in fact written by men—Vergil, Horace, Propertius, Livy—whose careers were established during the triumviral years, before Octavian assumed the title Augustus. Strictly speaking, Ovid is the poet whose work is most thoroughly embedded in the Augustan regime.

Impact and style 
Augustan literature produced the most widely read, influential, and enduring of Rome's poets. The Republican poets Catullus and Lucretius are their immediate predecessors; Lucan, Martial, Juvenal and Statius are their so-called "Silver Age" heirs. Although Vergil has sometimes been considered a "court poet", his Aeneid, the most important of the Latin epics, also permits complex readings on the source and meaning of Rome's power and the responsibilities of a good leader.

Ovid's works were wildly popular, but the poet was exiled by Augustus in one of literary history's great mysteries; carmen et error ("a poem" or "poetry" and "a mistake") is Ovid's own oblique explanation. Among prose works, the monumental history of Livy is preeminent for both its scope and stylistic achievement. The multi-volume work De architectura by Vitruvius also remains of great informational interest.

Questions pertaining to tone, or the writer's attitude toward his subject matter, are acute among the preoccupations of scholars who study the period. In particular, Augustan works are analyzed in an effort to understand the extent to which they advance, support, criticize or undermine social and political attitudes promulgated by the regime, official forms of which were often expressed in aesthetic media.

List of Augustan writers
 Publius Vergilius Maro (Virgil, spelled also as Vergil) (70 – 19 BC),
 Quintus Horatius Flaccus (Horace) (65 – 8 BC), known for lyric poetry and satires
 Sextus Aurelius Propertius (50 – 15 BC), poet
 Albius Tibullus (54 – 19 BC), elegiac poet
 Titus Livius (Livy) (64 BC – 12 AD), historian
 Publius Ovidius Naso (Ovid) (43 BC – 18 AD), poet
 Grattius Faliscus (a contemporary of Ovid), poet
 Marcus Manilius (1st century BC & AD), astrologer, poet
 Gaius Julius Hyginus (64 BC – 17 AD), librarian, poet, mythographer
 Marcus Verrius Flaccus (55 BC – 20 AD), grammarian, philologist, calendarist
 Marcus Vitruvius Pollio (80 70 BC – after 15 BC), engineer, architect
 Marcus Antistius Labeo (d. 10 or 11 AD), jurist, philologist
 Lucius Cestius Pius (1st century BC & AD), Latin educator
 Gnaeus Pompeius Trogus (1st century BC), historian, naturalist
 Marcus Porcius Latro (1st century BC), rhetorician
 Gaius Valgius Rufus (consul 12 BC), poet
 Sulpicia, elegiac poet

References

Augustus
Classical Latin literature
1st-century BC literature
1st-century literature